George Henry Knowling (March 23, 1856 – 1923) was a Canadian politician. He served on the Legislative Assembly of the Northwest Territories for Souris from 1891 to 1898.

Knowling was born in Brooklin, Canada West, and was educated nearby in Whitby. A lumber merchant, he was a member of the Church of England, and Conservative Party.

He was acclaimed in 1891 to the Legislative Assembly of the Northwest Territories, and served until his retirement at the 1898 election.

Electoral results

1891 election

1894 election

References

1856 births
1923 deaths
Members of the Legislative Assembly of the Northwest Territories